The county-designated highways in Michigan comprise a  system of primary county roads across the US state of Michigan. Unlike the State Trunkline Highway System, these highways have alphanumeric designations with letters that correspond to one of eight lettered zones in the state. The County-Designated Highway System (CDH System) was created in 1970 in response to the business concerns of a woman from Saugatuck. Her one-woman crusade in the 1960s started after the highway in front of her motel was turned over to local control as a county road and removed from state highway maps when the nearby freeway opened. After nearly a decade of efforts, the first two test highways were designated, one each in the Lower and Upper peninsulas of the state and included on the 1970 state highway map. The system was created and expanded in scope , after it was approved by the County Road Association of Michigan and the State Highway Commission.

The system uses eight lettered zones which are divided by major state highways. Each county road in the system is designated with the zone letter followed by a number. Six of the zones, A–F, are in the Lower Peninsula while the Upper Peninsula is divided into the remaining two, G and H. There have been a total of 66 different highways designated in seven of the zones; as of 2021 no E highways have been named. Participation by the county road commissions is optional, and not all counties use the system. One additional highway, Forest Highway 16 (marked as "H-16"), has appeared on state maps since the 1980s although it is not a part of the system. Of the highways designated, two were removed from the system and later partially restored.

History
When the Interstate 196 (I-196) freeway was built in the Saugatuck area in the 1960s, US Highway 31 (US 31) was shifted to the new freeway. The former route along Blue Star Highway was returned to county jurisdiction, which removed the various state highway markings from the roadway and displaced Blue Star Highway from the state highway maps of the time. At the time, Mr. and Mrs. Howard "Gene" Temple owned a motel along the roadway in Saugatuck, and they were dismayed over the number of canceled reservations they were receiving because guests could not find their business. Mrs. Temple approached the Village of Saugatuck and the local chamber of commerce to get better highway markings for the area. She even contacted state legislators and members of the State Highway Commission. No changes were made, even though businesses along Blue Star Highway were suffering from a lack of traffic.

Mrs. Temple contacted officials at the Allegan County Road Commission and the County Road Association of Michigan in August 1968. State Senator Gary Byker of Hudsonville was also contacted, and he convened meetings with representatives on the state, county and local levels in search of a solution. These meetings resulted in a test program for the 1970 state highway map that marked Blue Star Highway as A-2; the Allegan County Road Commission spent $2,000 (equivalent to $ in ) to erect about 50 markers along the road in their county. A second road in the Upper Peninsula was designated B-1 between Engadine and Rudyard in Mackinac and Chippewa counties. Both county roads on the state highway map contained the caption "Experimental Program for Identifying Key County Roads". The markers used were the blue and yellow pentagon shields developed by the National Association of County Engineers. Mrs. Temple earned an honor as the first woman in "Michigan to obtain a highway designation from the State Highway Commission".

The program was implemented by October 5, 1970, and expanded in scope. Instead of using designations beginning with an A for county roads in the Lower Peninsula and with a B for those in the Upper Peninsula, the system was divided into eight zones. The first of these revised assignments were shown on the 1971 state highway map; A-2 retained its number but B-1 was renumbered to H-40 in the Upper Peninsula. Earl Rogers, the engineer-director of the County Road Association of Michigan stated at the time that the county road commissions would gradually phase in signage over the coming years. Participation in the system was made optional, but all counties had agreed to the system. , no counties in the E zone have assigned roads to the system, and many counties in the other zones have yet to participate. The system comprises  of roadways.

Zone system

As implemented in October 1970, the CDH System is divided into eight zones: six in the Lower Peninsula and two in the Upper Peninsula. This contrasts to the state highway system that makes no attempt to group designations by geography in the state. The boundaries for each zone are determined by major state trunkline highways on each peninsula. Each highway is given a designation composed of the zone letter followed by a two-digit number. Within the zone, numbers are assigned on a grid system: north–south highways use odd numbers and east–west highways have even numbers. Lower numbers are used to the south or west sides of the zones.

The Lower Peninsula is divided into six zones, A-F:
The A zone is bordered by I-96 on the north and US 127 on the east. The other two sides are formed by the southern state line with Indiana and Ohio and the western boundary along Lake Michigan.
The B zone is bordered by I-96 on the south, Lake Michigan on the west, US 10 on the north and US 127 on the east.
The C zone is bordered by US 10 on the south and both I-75 and US 127 on the east. The northwestern boundary is Lake Michigan and the Straits of Mackinac.
The D zone is bordered by US 127 on the west, I-96 on the north, the Detroit River and Lake Erie to the east and Ohio to the south.
The E zone is bordered by I-96 on the south, US 127 on the west, US 10 and Saginaw Bay on the north and Lake Huron on the east. As of 2015, no highways have been designated in the E zone.
The F Zone is bordered by both I-75 and US 127 on the west, Lake Huron on the north and east with US 10 on the south.

The Upper Peninsula is divided into the G and H zones. The dividing line between the two zones is US 41, between Lakes Michigan and Superior with zone G to the west of US 41 and zone H to the east of it.

List

See also

Notes

References

Footnotes

Works cited

External links

Intercounty Highways at Michigan Highways

County-Designated Highways